Proclus Lycius (8 February 412 – 17 April 485), called Proclus the Successor (Próklos ho Diádokhos), was a Greek Neoplatonist philosopher, one of the last major classical philosophers of late antiquity. He set forth one of the most elaborate and fully developed systems of Neoplatonism and, through later interpreters and translators, exerted an influence on Byzantine philosophy, Early Islamic philosophy, and Scholastic philosophy.

Biography 
The primary source for the life of Proclus is the eulogy Proclus, or On Happiness that was written for him upon his death by his successor, Marinus, Marinus' biography set out to prove that Proclus reached the peak of virtue and attained eudaimonia. There are also a few details about the time in which he lived in the similarly structured Life of Isidore written by the philosopher Damascius in the following century.

According to Marinus, Proclus was born in 412 AD in Constantinople to a family of high social status from Lycia, and raised in Xanthus. He studied rhetoric, philosophy and mathematics in Alexandria, with the intent of pursuing a judicial position like his father. Before completing his studies, he returned to Constantinople when his rector, his principal instructor (one Leonas), had business there. Proclus became a successful practicing lawyer. However, the experience of the practice of law made Proclus realize that he truly preferred philosophy. He returned to Alexandria, and began determinedly studying the works of Aristotle under Olympiodorus the Elder. He also began studying mathematics during this period as well with a teacher named Heron (no relation to Hero of Alexandria, who was also known as Heron). As a gifted student, he eventually became dissatisfied with the level of philosophical instruction available in Alexandria, and went to Athens, philosophical center of the day, in 431 to study at the Neoplatonic successor of the New Academy, where he was taught by Plutarch of Athens (not to be confused with Plutarch of Chaeronea), Syrianus, and Asclepigenia; he succeeded Syrianus as head of the Academy in 437, and would in turn be succeeded on his death by Marinus of Neapolis. He lived in Athens as a vegetarian bachelor, prosperous and generous to his friends, until the end of his life, except for a one-year exile, to avoid pressure from Christian authorities. Marinus reports that he was writing seven hundred lines each day.

Philosophy 

One challenge with determining Proclus' specific doctrines is that the Neoplatonists of his time did not consider themselves innovators; they believed themselves to be the transmitters of the correct interpretations of Plato himself. Although the neoplatonic doctrines are much different from the doctrines in Plato's dialogues, it's often difficult to distinguish between different Neoplatonic thinkers and determine what is original to each one. For Proclus, this is largely only possible with Plotinus, the only other Neoplatonic writer for whom a significant amount of writings survive.

Proclus, like Plotinus and many of the other Neoplatonists, agreed on the three hypostases of Neoplatonism: The One (hen), The Intellect (nous) and The Soul (psyche), and wrote a commentary on the Enneads, of which unfortunately only fragments survive. At other times he criticizes Plotinus' views, such as the prime mover. Unlike Plotinus, Proclus also did not hold that matter was evil, an idea that caused contradictions in the system of Plotinus. It is difficult to determine what, if anything, is different between the doctrines of Proclus and Syrianus: for the latter, only a commentary on Aristotle's Metaphysics survives, and Proclus never criticizes his teacher in any of his preserved writings.

The particular characteristic of Proclus's system is his elaboration of a level of individual ones, called henads, between the One which is before being and intelligible divinity. The henads exist "superabundantly", also beyond being, but they stand at the head of chains of causation (seirai) and in some manner give to these chains their particular character. He identifies them with the Greek gods, so one henad might be Apollo and be the cause of all things apollonian, while another might be Helios and be the cause of all sunny things. Each henad participates in every other henad, according to its character. What appears to be multiplicity is not multiplicity at all, because any henad may rightly be considered the center of the polycentric system. According to Proclus, philosophy is the activity which can liberate the soul from a subjection to bodily passions, remind it of its origin in Soul, Intellect, and the One, and prepare it not only to ascend to the higher levels while still in this life, but to avoid falling immediately back into a new body after death. Because the soul's attention, while inhabiting a body, is turned so far away from its origin in the intelligible world, Proclus thinks that we need to make use of bodily reminders of our spiritual origin. In this he agrees with the doctrines of theurgy put forward by Iamblichus. Theurgy is possible because the powers of the gods (the henads) extend through their series of causation even down to the material world. And by certain power-laden words, acts, and objects, the soul can be drawn back up the series, so to speak. Proclus himself was a devotee of many of the religions in Athens, considering that the power of the gods could be present in these various approaches.

Works

Commentaries on Plato
The majority of Proclus's works are commentaries on dialogues of Plato (Alcibiades, Cratylus, Parmenides, Republic, Timaeus). In these commentaries, he presents his own philosophical system as a faithful interpretation of Plato, and in this he did not differ from other Neoplatonists, as he considered that "nothing in Plato's corpus is unintended or there by chance", that "Plato's writings were divinely inspired" (ὁ θεῖος Πλάτων ho theios Platon—the divine Plato, inspired by the gods), that "the formal structure and the content of Platonic texts imitated those of the universe", and therefore that they spoke often of things under a veil, hiding the truth from the philosophically uninitiated. Proclus was however a close reader of Plato, and quite often makes very astute points about his Platonic sources.

Commentary on Timaeus
In his commentary on Plato's Timaeus Proclus explains the role the Soul as a principle has in mediating the Forms in Intellect to the body of the material world as a whole. The Soul is constructed through certain proportions, described mathematically in the Timaeus, which allow it to make Body as a divided image of its own arithmetical and geometrical ideas.

Systematic works
In addition to his commentaries, Proclus wrote two major systematic works. The Elements of Theology (Στοιχείωσις θεολογική) consists of 211 propositions, each followed by a proof, beginning from the existence of the One (divine Unity) and ending with the descent of individual souls into the material world. The Platonic Theology (Περὶ τῆς κατὰ Πλάτωνα θεολογίας) is a systematization of material from Platonic dialogues, showing from them the characteristics of the divine orders, the part of the universe which is closest to the One.

We also have three essays, extant only in Latin translation: Ten doubts concerning providence (De decem dubitationibus circa providentiam); On providence and fate (De providentia et fato); On the existence of evils (De malorum subsistentia).

Other Works

Commentary on Euclid's Elements
Proclus, the scholiast to Euclid, knew  Eudemus of Rhodes' History of Geometry well, and gave a short sketch of the early history of geometry, which appeared to be founded on the older, lost book of Eudemus. The passage has been referred to as "the Eudemian summary," and determines some approximate dates, which otherwise might have remained unknown. The influential commentary on the first book of Euclid's Elements of Geometry is one of the most valuable sources we have for the history of ancient mathematics, and its Platonic account of the status of mathematical objects was influential.

In this work, Proclus also listed the first mathematicians associated with Plato: a mature set of mathematicians (Leodamas of Thasos, Archytas of Taras, and Theaetetus), a second set of younger mathematicians (Neoclides, Eudoxus of Cnidus), and a third yet younger set (Amyntas, Menaechmus and his brother Dinostratus, Theudius of Magnesia, Hermotimus of Colophon and Philip of Opus). Some of these mathematicians were influential in arranging the Elements that Euclid later published.

Lost Works
A number of his Platonic commentaries are lost. In addition to the Alcibiades, the Cratylus, the Timaeus, and the Parmenides, he also wrote commentaries on the remainder of the dialogues in the Neoplatonic curriculum. He also wrote a commentary on the Organon, as well as prolegomena to both Plato and Aristotle.

Legacy 
Proclus exerted a great deal of influence on Medieval philosophy, though largely indirectly, through the works of the commentator Pseudo-Dionysius the Areopagite. This late-5th- or early-6th-century Christian Greek author wrote under the pseudonym Dionysius the Areopagite, the figure converted by St. Paul in Athens. Because of this fiction, his writings were taken to have almost apostolic authority. He is an original Christian writer, and in his works can be found a great number of Proclus's metaphysical principles.

Another important source for the influence of Proclus on the Middle Ages is Boethius's Consolation of Philosophy, which has a number of Proclus principles and motifs. The central poem of Book III is a summary of Proclus's Commentary on the Timaeus, and Book V contains the important principle of Proclus that things are known not according to their own nature, but according to the character of the knowing subject.

A summary of Proclus's Elements of Theology circulated under the name Liber de Causis (the Book of Causes). This book is of uncertain origin, but circulated in the Arabic world as a work of Aristotle, and was translated into Latin as such. It had great authority because of its supposed Aristotelian origin, and it was only when Proclus's Elements were translated into Latin that Thomas Aquinas realised its true origin. Proclus's works also exercised an influence during the Renaissance through figures such as Nicholas of Cusa and Marsilio Ficino. The most significant early scholar of Proclus in the English-speaking world was Thomas Taylor, who produced English translations of most of his works.

The crater Proclus on the Moon is named after him.

See also 
 Allegorical interpretations of Plato

Notes

Bibliography

Proclus's works in Translation

Elements of Theology:
 
Platonic Theology: A long (six volumes in the Budé edition) systematic work, using evidence from Plato's dialogues to describe the character of the various divine orders
 
Commentary on Alcibiades
 
Commentary on Cratylus
 
Commentary on Plato's "Timaeus"
 
 
Commentary on Plato's "Parmenides"
 
Commentary on Plato's "Republic"
A Commentary on the First Book of Euclid's "Elements"
 
Elements of Physics
Three small works: Ten doubts concerning providence; On providence and fate; On the existence of evils
Proclus On Providence (in English and Ancient Greek). Translated by Steel, Carlos. London; New York: Bloomsbury Academic. 2007. ISBN 9781472501479.
Proclus Ten Problems Concerning Providence (in English and Ancient Greek). Translated by Opsomer, Jan; Steel, Carlos. London; New Delhi; New York; Sydney: Bloomsbury. 2012. ISBN 9781472501783.
Proclus On the Existence of Evils (in English, Ancient Greek, and Latin). Translated by Opsomer, Jan; Steel, Carlos. London; New York: Bloomsbury. 2014 [2003]. ISBN 9781472501035.
On the Eternity of the World, De Aeternitate Mundi, Proclus (in English and Ancient Greek). Translated by Lang, Helen S.; Macro, A. D.; McGinnis, Jon. Berkeley; Los Angeles; London: University of California Press. 2001. ISBN 0520225546.
Various Hymns
Berg, R.M. van den (2001). Mansfeld, J.; Runia, D.T; Van Winden, J. C. M. (eds.). Proclus' Hymns. Philosophia Antiqua, A Series of Studies on Ancient Philosophy (in English and Ancient Greek). Vol. 90. Translated by Berg, R.M. van den. Leiden, Boston, Köln: Koninklijke Brill NV, Leiden, The Netherlands. ISBN 9004122362.
Commentary on the Chaldaean Oracles (fragments)
Proclus The Successor on Poetics and the Homeric Poems (in English and Ancient Greek). Translated by Lamberton, Robert. Atlanta, Georgia, USA: Society of Biblical Literature. 2012. ISBN 9781589837119.
 Fragments of lost works
 
The Liber de Causis (Book of Causes) is not a work by Proclus, but a summary of his work the Elements of Theology, likely written by an Arabic interpreter.

References

Further reading 

Monographs
 
 
 
 
 
 
KINESIS AKINETOS: A study of spiritual motion in the philosophy of Proclus, by Stephen Gersh
From Iamblichus to Eriugena. An investigation of the prehistory and evolution of the Pseudo-Dionysius tradition, by Stephen Gersh
The Philosophy of Proclus – the Final Phase of Ancient Thought, by L J Rosan
The Logical Principles of Proclus' Stoicheiôsis Theologikê as Systematic Ground of the Cosmos, by James Lowry

Collections
 
 
 
 
 
 
 
 
On Proclus and his Influence in Medieval Philosophy, ed. by E.P. Bos and P.A. Meijer (Philosophia antiqua 53), Leiden-Köln-New York: Brill, 1992.
The perennial tradition of neoplatonism, ed. by J. Cleary (Ancient and medieval philosophy, Series I, 24), Leuven: Leuven University Press, 1997.

Bibliographic resources

External links

Article by Encyclopædia Britannica

Editions and Translations Proclus – Hoger Instituut voor Wijsbegeerte
Article at "The Encyclopedia of Goddess Athena"

Fragments that Remain of the Lost Writings of Proclus Thomas Taylor translation.
Commentaries of Proclus on the Timaeus of Plato, in Five Books Thomas Taylor translation.
Ten Doubts Concerning Providence and On the Existence of Evils Thomas Taylor translation.
Proclus's Life and Teachings
Index page of the Proclus section for the "Plato Transformed" project at the University Leuven, Belgium.
Commentary on Plato's Parmenides – (Greek text, scans of Cousin's edition)
Catalogue of the Prometheus Trust "Thomas Taylor Series" which includes translations of many of the works of Proclus. The site has lengthy extracts of these.
Proclus's Commentary on Euclid, Book I. PDF scans of Friedlein's Greek edition, now in the public domain (Classical Greek)
On the Signs of Divine Possession – (partial translation of Proclus's work)
On the Sacred Art – (translation and discussion of this surviving extract from a larger work by Proclus)
On the Sacred Art (French introduction and Greek text) 
On the Sacred Art - Greek text and English translation
Hypotyposis Astronomicon Hypotheseon - Greek text 
Proclus in English and Greek, Select Online Resources
 
Guide to Proclus, Elementa theologica. Manuscript, 1582 at the University of Chicago Special Collections Research Center

412 births
487 deaths
5th-century Byzantine people
5th-century philosophers
Ancient Greek mathematicians
Pagan anti-Gnosticism
Commentators on Plato
Neoplatonists
Neoplatonists in Athens
Ontologists
People from Constantinople
Philosophers of mathematics
People from Roman Anatolia
Late-Roman-era pagans
5th-century Byzantine writers
5th-century mathematicians
5th-century Byzantine scientists